Hornby Village Institute is a public building in Main Street, Hornby, Lancashire, England.  It is considered to be important architecturally, and is recorded in the National Heritage List for England as a designated Grade II listed building.

History

The building was designed by the Lancaster architects Austin and Paley, and was the last public building to be designed by the practice before the death of Hubert Austin in 1915.  It was completed in 1916, and was paid for by the lord of the manor, Colonel Foster.  By the 1950s more accommodation was needed, and an extension was added to the rear in 1956, helped by a donation from Sir Harold Parkinson of Hornby Castle.  Another extension was added in 2005, designed by Harrison Pitt Architects.

Architecture

The original part of the building is in Jacobean style.  It is constructed in rubble stone with ashlar dressings and a slate roof.  The central bay projects forward and contains a porch with a round-headed entrance flanked by pilasters.  Above this are four windows, with the word "INSTITUTE" below.  At the top of the bay is a semi-circular pediment containing a crested plaque.  The lateral bays have four windows in the lower storey, and blind windows above.

Present day

The building is known as the Hornby Institute Community Resource Centre, and has facilities for meetings, conferences, and performances.  Parts of the building are licensed for civil weddings.

See also

Listed buildings in Hornby-with-Farleton
List of non-ecclesiastical works by Austin and Paley (1895–1914)

References

External links
Official website

Grade II listed buildings in Lancashire
Buildings and structures in the City of Lancaster
Austin and Paley buildings
Buildings and structures completed in 1916
1916 establishments in England